Tournaments include international (FIBA), professional (club) and amateur and collegiate levels.

National team tournaments

Men's Senior Division: All-Tournament Team

Women's Senior Division: All-Tournament Team

Youth Division: All-Tournament Team

Professional club seasons

Continental championships
Men:
Euroleague:   Regal FC Barcelona
Eurocup:  Power Electronics Valencia
EuroChallenge:  BG Göttingen
Asia Champions Cup:  Mahram Tehran
Liga Sudamericana:  Quimsa

Women:
EuroLeague Women:  Spartak Moscow Region

National championships
Men:
 NBA
Season:
 Division champions: Boston Celtics (Atlantic), Cleveland Cavaliers (Central), Orlando Magic (Southeast), Denver Nuggets (Northwest), Los Angeles Lakers (Pacific), Dallas Mavericks (Southwest)
 Best regular-season record: Cleveland Cavaliers (61–21)
 Eastern Conference: Boston Celtics
 Western Conference: Los Angeles Lakers
 Finals: The Lakers defeat the Celtics 4–3 in the best-of-seven series, with Kobe Bryant named Finals MVP.
 Liga Nacional de Básquet, 2009–10 season:
 Regular season: Peñarol
 Playoffs: Peñarol defeat Atenas 4–1 in the best-of-seven final.
 National Basketball League, 2009–10 season:
 Premiers: Perth Wildcats
 Champions: Perth Wildcats defeat the Wollongong Hawks 2–1 in the best-of-three Grand Final.
 Basketball League Belgium:
 Bulgarian National League: Lukoil Academic defeat Levski Sofia 3–1 in the best-of-five final.
 Chinese Basketball Association:
 Regular season: Guangdong Southern Tigers
 Playoffs: Guangdong Southern Tigers defeat Xinjiang Flying Tigers 4–1 in the best-of-seven final.
 Croatian League: Cibona defeat Zadar 3–2 in the best-of-five final.
 Czech League: Nymburk defeat Prostějov 4–1 in the best-of-seven final.
 Dutch Eredivisie: GasTerra Flames Groningen defeat WCAA Giants Bergen op Zoom 4–1 in the best-of-seven final.
 Estonian League, 2009–10: TÜ/Rock defeat Rakvere Tarvas 4–2 in the best-of-7 final.
 French Pro A League: Cholet defeat Le Mans 81–65 in the one-off final.
 German Bundesliga, 2009–10 season: Brose Baskets defeat Deutsche Bank Skyliners 3–2 in the bist-of-five final.
 Greek League, 2009–10 season: Panathinaikos defeat Olympiacos 3–1 in the best-of-five final.
 Iranian Super League, 2009–10 season: Mahram defeat Zob Ahan 2–0 in the best-of-three final.
 Israeli Super League, 2009–10 season: Gilboa/Galil defeat Maccabi Tel Aviv 90–77 in the one-off final.
 Italian Serie A, 2009–10 season: Montepaschi Siena sweep AJ Milano 4–0 in the best-of-seven final.
 Latvian League: Barons defeat VEF Riga 4–3 in the best-of-seven final.
 Lithuanian LKL: Lietuvos Rytas defeat Žalgiris 4–3 in the best-of-seven final.
 Montenegro League:
 Philippine Basketball Association, 2009–10 season:
Philippine Cup: Purefoods Tender Juicy Giants sweep the Alaska Aces 4–0 in the best-of-seven final.
Fiesta Conference: Alaska Aces defeat the San Miguel Beermen 4–2 in the best-of-seven final.
 Polish League: Asseco Prokom Gdynia sweep Anwil Włocławek 4–0 in the best-of-seven final.
 Russian Super League: CSKA Moscow sweep Khimki Moscow Region 3–0 in the best-of-five final.
 Serbia Super League:
 Slovenian League: Krka defeat Union Olimpija 3–2 in the best-of-five final.
 Spanish ACB:
Season: Regal FC Barcelona
Playoffs: Caja Laboral Baskonia sweep Regal FC Barcelona 3–0 in the best-of-five final.
 Turkish Basketball League: Fenerbahçe Ülker defeat Efes Pilsen 4–2 in the best-of-seven final.
 Ukrainian SuperLeague: Azovmash Mariupol defeat Budivelnyk Kyiv 3–2 in the best-of-five final.
 British Basketball League, 2009–10:
Season: Newcastle Eagles
Playoffs: Everton Tigers defeat the Glasgow Rocks 80–72 in the one-off final.
  Adriatic League: Partizan Belgrade defeat Cibona 75–74 in overtime in the one-off final.
  Baltic League: Žalgiris defeat Lietuvos Rytas 73–66 in the one-off final.
  VTB United League, 2009–10 season: CSKA Moscow defeat UNICS Kazan 66–55 in the one-off final.
 Super Basketball League:Yulon Dinos defeat Dacin Tigers 4–2 in the best-of-seven final.

Women:
 WNBA
Season:
 Eastern Conference: Atlanta Dream
 Western Conference: Seattle Storm
 Finals: The Storm sweep the Dream 3–0, with their center Lauren Jackson becoming the first non-U.S. player to be named Finals MVP.

College
Men
 NCAA
Division I: Duke 61, Butler 59
Most Outstanding Player: Kyle Singler, Duke
National Invitation Tournament: Dayton 79, North Carolina 68
College Basketball Invitational: Virginia Commonwealth defeats Saint Louis 2–0 in the best-of-three final.
CollegeInsider.com Tournament: Missouri State 78, Pacific 65
Division II: Cal Poly Pomona 65, Indiana (PA) 53
Division III: Wisconsin–Stevens Point 78, Williams 73
 NAIA
NAIA Division I: Oklahoma Baptist 84, Azusa Pacific 83
NAIA Division II: Saint Francis (IN) 67, Walsh 66
 NJCAA
Division I: Howard (TX) 85, Three Rivers 80 (OT)
Division II: Lincoln (IL) 71, Cincinnati State 60
Division III: Joliet 94, Rochester (MN) 82
 UAAP Men's: Ateneo sweeps FEU in the best of three finals 2–0
 NCAA (Philippines) Seniors': San Beda sweeps San Sebastian in the best of five finals 3–0

Women
 NCAA
Division I: Connecticut 53, Stanford 47
Most Outstanding Player: Maya Moore, Connecticut
WNIT: California 73, Miami (FL) 61
Women's Basketball Invitational: Appalachian State 79, Memphis 71
Division II: Emporia State 65, Fort Lewis 53
Division III: Washington University in St. Louis 65, Hope 59
 NAIA
NAIA Division I: Union (TN) 73, Azusa Pacific 65
NAIA Division II: Northwestern (IA) 85, Shawnee State 66
 NJCAA
Division I:Gulf Coast Community College 83, Jefferson College 61
Division II:Kirkwood Community College 72, Patrick & Henry Community College 62
Division III:Madison College 74, Onondaga Community College 55
 UAAP Women's:

Prep
 USA Today Boys Basketball Ranking #1:
 USA Today Girls Basketball Ranking #1:
 NCAA (Philippines) Juniors:
 UAAP Juniors:

Awards and honors

Basketball Hall of Fame
Class of 2010:
Players: Cynthia Cooper, Dennis Johnson, Gus Johnson, Karl Malone, Maciel Pereira, Scottie Pippen
Coaches: Bob Hurley, Sr.
Contributors: Jerry Buss
Teams: 1960 USA Olympic Team, 1992 USA Olympic Men's Team (aka the "Dream Team")

Women's Basketball Hall of Fame
Class of 2010
 Leta Andrews
 Teresa Edwards
 Rebecca Lobo
 Gloria Ray
 Teresa Weatherspoon
 Chris Weller

FIBA Hall of Fame
Class of 2010
Players
 Arvydas Sabonis
 Cheryl Miller
 Dino Meneghin
 Dragan Ki?anovi?
 Natalya Zasulskaya
 Oscar Schmidt
 Vlade Divac
Coaches
 Evgeny Gomelsky
 Lindsay Gaze
 Mirko Novosel
Referees
 Jim Bain
 Konstantinos Dimou
Contributors
 Abdoulaye Seye Moreau
 George Killian
 Hans-Joachim Otto

Professional
Men
NBA Most Valuable Player Award: LeBron James, Cleveland Cavaliers
NBA Rookie of the Year Award: Tyreke Evans, Sacramento Kings
NBA Defensive Player of the Year Award: Dwight Howard, Orlando Magic
NBA Sixth Man of the Year Award: Jamal Crawford, Atlanta Hawks
NBA Most Improved Player Award: Aaron Brooks, Houston Rockets
NBA Sportsmanship Award: Grant Hill, Phoenix Suns
NBA Coach of the Year Award: Scott Brooks, Oklahoma City Thunder
J. Walter Kennedy Citizenship Award: Samuel Dalembert, Philadelphia 76ers
NBA Executive of the Year Award: John Hammond, Milwaukee Bucks
FIBA Europe Player of the Year Award: Announced in February 2011
Euroscar Award:
Mr. Europa:
Women
WNBA Most Valuable Player Award: Lauren Jackson, Seattle Storm
WNBA Defensive Player of the Year Award: Tamika Catchings, Indiana Fever
WNBA Rookie of the Year Award: Tina Charles, Connecticut Sun
WNBA Sixth Woman of the Year Award: DeWanna Bonner, Phoenix Mercury
WNBA Most Improved Player Award: Leilani Mitchell, New York Liberty
Kim Perrot Sportsmanship Award: Tamika Catchings, Indiana Fever
WNBA Coach of the Year Award: Brian Agler, Seattle Storm
WNBA Finals Most Valuable Player Award: Lauren Jackson, Seattle Storm
FIBA Europe Player of the Year Award: Announced in February 2011

Collegiate 
 Combined
Legends of Coaching Award: Billy Donovan, Florida
 Men
John R. Wooden Award: Evan Turner, Ohio State
Naismith College Coach of the Year: Jim Boeheim, Syracuse
Frances Pomeroy Naismith Award: Sherron Collins, Kansas
Associated Press College Basketball Player of the Year: Evan Turner, Ohio State
NCAA basketball tournament Most Outstanding Player: Kemba Walker, Connecticut
USBWA National Freshman of the Year: John Wall, Kentucky
Associated Press College Basketball Coach of the Year: Jim Boeheim, Syracuse
Naismith Outstanding Contribution to Basketball: John Thompson Jr
 Women
John R. Wooden Award: Tina Charles, Connecticut
Naismith College Player of the Year: Tina Charles, Connecticut
Naismith College Coach of the Year: Connie Yori, Nebraska
Wade Trophy: Maya Moore, Connecticut
Frances Pomeroy Naismith Award: Alexis Gray-Lawson, California
Associated Press Women's College Basketball Player of the Year: Tina Charles, Connecticut
NCAA basketball tournament Most Outstanding Player: Maya Moore, UConn
Basketball Academic All-America Team: Maya Moore, UConn
Kay Yow Award: Connie Yori, Nebraska
Carol Eckman Award: Kevin Cook, Gallaudet University
Maggie Dixon Award: Teresa Weatherspoon, Louisiana Tech
USBWA National Freshman of the Year: Brittney Griner, Baylor
Associated Press College Basketball Coach of the Year: Connie Yori, Nebraska
List of Senior CLASS Award women's basketball winners: Kelsey Griffin, Nebraska
Nancy Lieberman Award: Andrea Riley, Oklahoma State
Naismith Outstanding Contribution to Basketball: Marsha Sharp

Events

July 8 – LeBron James makes the decision to sign with the Miami Heat joining new signee Chris Bosh and Dwyane Wade.  The decision was televised in an hour-long special on ESPN.
December 21 – The University of Connecticut women's team wins its 89th consecutive game, surpassing the NCAA Division I record previously held by the UCLA men's team of 1971–1974.
December 30 – UConn's record winning streak ends at 90 when the Huskies lose 71–59 to Stanford.

Movies
 Just Wright – a romantic comedy film starring rappers Common and Queen Latifah that tells the story of a physical therapist who falls in love with a pro basketball player; film also features the NBA's Dwight Howard.
 Once Brothers – a TV documentary, jointly produced by ESPN Films and NBA Entertainment, focusing on Serb Vlade Divac and Croat Dražen Petrović, former Yugoslavia national teammates, and how the Yugoslav wars permanently broke their friendship.

Deaths
 January 8 — Bob Blackburn, American radio and TV play-by-play announcer (Seattle SuperSonics) (born 1924)
 January 19 — Dan Fitzgerald, American college coach (Gonzaga) (born 1942)
 January 28 — Bud Millikan, American college coach (Maryland) (born 1920)
 February 3 — Dick McGuire, Hall of Fame player for the New York Knicks (born 1926)
 February 10 — Carl Braun, player and coach for the New York Knicks (born 1927)
 February 10 — Fred Schaus, American coach of West Virginia University and the Los Angeles Lakers (born 1925)
 February 13 — Red Rocha, American BAA and NBA player (born 1925)
 February 15 — Dana Kirk, former college coach at Memphis State University (born 1936)
 June 4 — John Wooden, Hall of Fame player (Purdue, Indianapolis Kautskys) and coach (UCLA) (born 1910)
 June 11 — Bus Whitehead, All-American college (Nebraska) and AAU (Phillips 66ers) player (born 1928)
 June 13 — Tom Stith, All-American at St. Bonaventure University (born 1939)
 June 19 — Manute Bol, Sudanese NBA player, tallest player in league history (born 1962)
 July 8 — Melvin Turpin, All-American at Kentucky and NBA veteran (born 1960)
 July 16 — Aleksandr Boloshev, Russian Olympic champion (born 1947)
 July 19 — Lorenzen Wright, American NBA player (born 1975)
 August 30 — Sharm Scheuerman, American college player and coach (Iowa) (born 1934)
 October 14 — Larry Siegfried, won five NBA titles with the Boston Celtics and an NCAA title at Ohio State (born 1939)
 October 25 — Roy Skinner, American college coach at Vanderbilt (born 1930)
 October 28 — Marshall Hawkins, American NBL and NBA player (born 1924)
 October 31 — Maurice Lucas,  American ABA and NBA player.  Won an NBA championship with the Portland Trail Blazers in 1977 (born 1952)
 November 8 — Quintin Dailey, All-American at San Francisco and NBA player (born 1961)
 November 13 — Red Curren, Canadian Olympic player (1952) (born 1925)
 December 6 — Art Quimby, NCAA rebounding leader; a Connecticut Huskie of Honor (born 1933)
 December 6 — Hank Raymonds, American college coach (Marquette) (born 1924)

See also
 Timeline of women's basketball

References

External links